La Berra (1,719 m) is a mountain of the Swiss Prealps, overlooking the Lake of Gruyère in the canton of Fribourg.

See also
List of mountains of Switzerland accessible by public transport

References

External links
 La Berra on Hikr

Mountains of Switzerland
Mountains of the Alps
Mountains of the canton of Fribourg
One-thousanders of Switzerland